Husberg is a surname. Notable people with the surname include:

Amanda Husberg (born 1940), American composer of hymns
Maud Husberg (1934–2008), Swedish television presenter and announcer
Rolf Husberg (1908–1998), Swedish film director, cinematographer, screenwriter, and actor

See also
Hutberg (disambiguation)